USS Amagansett (SP-693) was a United States Navy patrol vessel and minesweeper in commission from 1917 to 1920.

Amagansett was built as a commercial "menhaden fisherman"-type steam fishing trawler of the same name at Kennebunk, Maine, in 1879. In May 1917, the U.S. Navy acquired her from Mr. E. Benson Dennis of Cape Charles, Virginia, for use during World War I. Assigned the section patrol number 693, she was commissioned at Norfolk, Virginia, on 17 May 1917 as USS Amagansett (SP-693). The Navy officially chartered her from Dennis on 18 May 1917.

Fitted out as a minesweeper and assigned to the 5th Naval District, Amagansett was based at Norfolk throughout her naval career. She served on patrol and minesweeping duties in the Norfolk area through the end of World War I and until March 1919.

Amagansett was decommissioned on 12 March 1919 and stricken from the Navy Directory and returned to Dennis simultaneously the same day.

References

Department of the Navy Naval History and Heritage Command Online Library of Selected Images: U.S. Navy Ships: USS Amagansett (SP-693), 1917–1919. Originally, and later, the civilian fishing vessel Amagansett.
NavSource Online: Section Patrol Craft Photo Archive Amagansett (SP 692)

Patrol vessels of the United States Navy
World War I patrol vessels of the United States
Minesweepers of the United States Navy
World War I minesweepers of the United States
Ships built in Kittery, Maine
1879 ships